Sybil Mulcahy (born 1973) is an Irish journalist and presenter, known for co-presenting TV3's The Morning Show with Sybil & Martin since 2009.

Early life
Born in Ballsbridge, Dublin, Mulcahy was educated locally before being conferred with a Bachelor of Arts from University College Dublin. She subsequently attended University College Galway, where she attained a H.Dip in Applied Communications. She has also completed a marketing diploma.

Career
She began her broadcasting career in San Diego in the mid-1990s, where she worked on the Education Channel as a reporter and editor in a CBS affiliate. She returned to Ireland in 1999 where she joined TV3. She worked with the station's news division and spent several years as entertainment reporter. In 2007 Mulcahy joined TV3's entertainment show Xposé as a reporter. She spent two years with that programme before leaving in 2009 to co-present The Morning Show with Martin King.

Personal life
Mulcahy married John Prendeville on 17 July 2004.  The couple have three children, Hugh (born 2006), Genevieve (born 2008), and Michael (born 2012).

In February 2015, she decided to take redundancy and to operate at TV3 in a freelance contract (rather than fulltime employee) capacity.

References

External links
 

1974 births
Living people
Alumni of the University of Galway
Alumni of University College Dublin
People from Ballsbridge
Virgin Media News newsreaders and journalists